The Kuriakose Gregorios College, Pampady (commonly known as KG College) is situated in Pampady,  from Kottayam. It was started in 1981 and is affiliated to Mahatma Gandhi University, Kottayam, Kerala, India.

Courses of study

Degree Courses
The academic degree courses consist of three parts
 Part I : English.
 Part II : Additional Language (Hindi/Malayalam)
 Part III : Optional Subjects

The following groups of optional subjects are offered
B.COM
2005-2008 batch (Sparkx)
B.A
Economics
B.Sc
Physics Applied Electronics
2005-2008 batch (Staticloops)
Chemistry
Biology
B.B.A
M.Sc
Physics Applied Electronics
Biology from 2013-2014 Academic Year
M.A
Economics
M.Com

Extracurricular activities
 NCC (National Cadet Corps)
    It has an NCC Army wing Under 16 Kerala Betalion, as The Company-7. It is under the Kottayam Group Situated at Kanjikuzhy, Kottayam.
   
   Associate NCC Officer of NCC Sub Unit is Lt. Roy Mathew Vettoor

  Senior Under Officers / Senior Cadets of the Company:
       
       2008-2009: Senior Under Officer Mr Vishnu Mohan 
       Remya (Attended Republic Day Camp, Delhi-2009)
       2010-2011: Rameez Mohammed (Attended Republic Day Camp, Delhi-2011)
       2010-2011: Chandana V.V (Attended Thal Sainik Camp, Delhi-2010)
       2012-2013: Thomas Joseph (Attended Thal Sainik Camp, Delhi-2012)
       2013-2014: Manu P.S (Attended Republic Day Camp, Delhi-2013)

External links
 Official site
Pampady Dayara Official site

Arts colleges in India
Colleges in Kerala
Universities and colleges in Kottayam district
Colleges affiliated to Mahatma Gandhi University, Kerala
Educational institutions established in 1981
1981 establishments in Kerala